Angang-eup is an eup, or town, and the second-largest subdivision of Gyeongju City. Its 139 square kilometers are home to about 33,300 people and is served by six elementary schools and two joint middle-high schools. Situated next to Gangdong-myeon in the city's northern tip, it is a significant town in its own right. Angang Station is a regular stop on the Donghae Nambu Line. The town center lies on the Hyeongsan River, near where it meets the small Chilpyeongcheon stream. Important local products include rice, apples, and grapes.

Administrative divisions
Gapsan-ri (갑산리)
Ganggyo-ri (강교리)
Geomdan-ri (검단리)
Geungye-ri (근계리)
Nodang-ri (노당리)
Daedong-ri (대동리)
Duryu-ri (두류리)
Sabang-ri (사방리)
Sandae-ri (산대리)
Angang-ri (안강리)
Yangwol-ri (양월리)
Oksan-ri (옥산리)
Uktong-ri (육통리)
Cheongnyeong-ri (청령리)
Hagok-ri (하곡리)

See also
Subdivisions of Gyeongju
Administrative divisions of South Korea

References

External links
 The official site of Gampo-eup

Subdivisions of Gyeongju
Towns and townships in North Gyeongsang Province